Constanza Amundson Téves (born 12 February 1998) is a Spanish field hockey player.

Personal life
Constanza Amundson has a twin sister, Florencia, who also plays field hockey for Spain.

Career

Club level
In club competition, Amundson plays for Real Club de Polo in the Liga Iberdrola.

Junior national teams
Constanza Amundson has represented Spain in junior hockey at both Under–18 and Under–21 levels.

Under–18
Amundson made her first appearance for the Spain U–18 team in 2015 at the EuroHockey Youth Championship in Santander.

The following year she represented the team at another EuroHockey Youth Championship, held in Cork.

Under–21
She made her debut for the Spanish U–21 team in 2016. She first represented the side in a 5–Nations Tournament in Valencia. Later that year, she went on to compete at the FIH Junior World Cup in Santiago.

She represented the team again in 2017 at the EuroHockey Junior Championship in Valencia.

In 2019 she made her final appearance with the junior national team. She was a member of the side the achieved an historic gold medal at the EuroHockey Junior Championships in Valencia.

Las Redsticks
Constanza Amundson made her senior international debut for Las Redsticks in 2021, during season three of the FIH Pro League.

References

External links
 
 

1998 births
Living people
Spanish female field hockey players
Female field hockey forwards
Place of birth missing (living people)